Surveyor 1 was the first lunar soft-lander in the uncrewed Surveyor program of the National Aeronautics and Space Administration (NASA, United States). This lunar soft-lander gathered data about the lunar surface that would be needed for the crewed Apollo Moon landings that began in 1969. The successful soft landing of Surveyor 1 on the Ocean of Storms was the first by an American space probe on any extraterrestrial body, occurring on the first attempt and just four months after the first soft Moon landing by the Soviet Union's Luna 9 probe.

Surveyor 1 was launched May 30, 1966, from the Cape Canaveral Air Force Station at Cape Canaveral, Florida, and it landed on the Moon on June 2, 1966. Surveyor 1 transmitted 11,237 still photos of the lunar surface to the Earth by using a television camera and a sophisticated radio-telemetry system.

The Surveyor program was managed by the Jet Propulsion Laboratory, in Los Angeles County, California, and the Surveyor space probe was built by  the Hughes Aircraft Company in El Segundo, California.

Mission description 

The Surveyor series of space probes was designed to carry out the first soft landings on the Moon by any American spacecraft. No instrumentation was carried specifically for scientific experiments by Surveyor 1, but considerable scientific data were collected by its television camera and then returned to Earth via the Deep Space Network from 1966 to 1967. These spacecraft carried two television cameras — one for its approach, which was not used in this case, and one for taking still pictures of the lunar surface. Over 100 engineering sensors were on board each Surveyor. Their television systems transmitted pictures of the spacecraft footpad and surrounding lunar terrain and surface materials. These spacecraft also acquired data on the radar reflectivity of the lunar surface, the load-bearing strength of the lunar surface, and the temperatures for use in the analysis of the lunar surface temperatures. (Later Surveyor space probes, beginning with Surveyor 3, carried scientific instruments to measure the composition and mechanical properties of the lunar "soil".)

Surveyor 1 was launched May 30, 1966 and sent directly into a trajectory to the Moon without any parking orbit. Its retrorockets were turned off at a height of about 3.4 meters above the lunar surface. Surveyor 1 fell freely to the surface from this height, and it landed on the lunar surface on June 2, 1966, on the Oceanus Procellarum. This is within the northeast portion of the large crater called Flamsteed P (or the Flamsteed Ring). Flamsteed itself lies within Flamsteed P on the south side.

The duration of the spaceflight of Surveyor 1 was about 63 hours, 30 minutes.

Surveyor 1 transmitted video data from the Moon beginning shortly after its landing through July 14, 1966, but with a period of no operations during the two-week long lunar night of June 14, 1966 through July 7, 1966. Because the Moon always presents the same face to Earth, "line-of-sight" radio communications with Surveyor 1 required only changes in ground stations as the Earth rotated. However, since it was solar-powered, Surveyor 1 had no electricity with which to function during the two weeks of the lunar nights.

The return of engineering information (temperatures, etc.) from Surveyor 1 continued through January 7, 1967, with several interruptions during the lunar nights.

The landing of Surveyor 1 was carried live on some television networks, and the success of the first Surveyor landing was considered surprising, especially after the failure of a number of the Ranger spacecraft en route to the Moon. Justin Rennilson, formerly of Jet Propulsion Laboratory, stated, "We figured the probability of success at around 10 to 15 percent." Among hundreds of other challenges, an uninterrupted communication link for navigation and control was critical to success.

Science instruments

Television 

The TV camera consisted of a vidicon tube, a zoom lens operated at either end of its range resulting in 25 millimeter and 100 millimeter focal-lengths, resulting in optical fields of view of 25.3 or 6.43 degrees, a shutter, several optical filters, and iris-system mounted along an axis inclined approximately 16 degrees from the central axis of Surveyor 1. The camera was mounted under a mirror that could be moved in azimuth and elevation. The rotation of the mirror in the azimuth direction, while providing azimuth coverage capability results in an image rotation proportional to the angular azimuth position of the mirror. This is because the image plane and scanning raster of the vidicon are stationary with respect to the mirror azimuth axis. The mirror drive mechanism consisting of stepper motors provided a step size of 2.48° ±0.1° in elevation and 3.0° ±0.1° in azimuth. This calibrated stepping reference allowed the creation of large composite mosaics of the lunar surface and using the data read-back from the iris and focus positioning of the lens permitted some photogrammetric measurements of various lunar features. The TV camera's operation was dependent on the receipt of the proper radio commands from the Earth. Frame-by-frame coverage of the lunar surface was obtained over 360 degrees in azimuth and from +40 degrees above the plane normal to the camera's axis to -65 degrees below this plane. Both 600-line and 200-line modes of operation were used. The 200-line mode transmitted over an omnidirectional antenna for the first 14 photos and scanned one frame every 61.8 seconds. The remaining transmissions were of 600-line pictures over a directional antenna, and each frame was scanned every 3.6 seconds. Each 200-line picture required 20 seconds for a complete video transmission and it used a radio bandwidth of about 1.2 kilohertz.

Each 600-line picture required about one second to be read from the vidicon tube, and they required a radio bandwidth of about 220 kilohertz. The data transmissions were converted into a standard TV signal for both closed-circuit TV and broadcast TV. The television images were displayed on Earth on a slow-scan monitor coated with a long persistency phosphor. The persistency was selected to optimally match the nominal maximum frame rate. One frame of TV identification was received for each incoming TV frame, and it was displayed in real time at a rate compatible with the incoming image. These data were recorded on a video magnetic tape recorder. Over 10,000 pictures were taken by Surveyor 1's TV camera before the lunar sunset of June 14, 1966. Included in these pictures were wide-angle and narrow-angle panoramas, focus ranging surveys, photometric surveys, special area surveys, and celestial photography. Surveyor 1 responded to commands to activate the camera on July 7, and by July 14, 1966, it had returned nearly 1000 more pictures.

Strain gauge 
Strain gauges were mounted on each leg shock absorber to record the peak axial forces at landing impact of the spacecraft. They were designed to accept a force of approximately 800 kgf (7.8 kN).

Legacy and Status 

On January 6, 1967, Surveyor 1 was reactivated for 12 hours. The spacecraft returned data on the motion of the Moon, which would be used to refine the map of its orbital path around the Earth as well as better determine the distance between the two worlds.

See also

 List of artificial objects on the Moon

References

External links 
 Surveyor 1 digitized panorama with color photometric target, from Surveyor Digitization Project
 
 Panoramas of the Surveyor 1 landing site, from The International Atlas of Lunar Exploration by Philip J. Stooke
 Surveyor Program Results (PDF) 1969
 Surveyor I – A Preliminary Report – June 1, 1966 (PDF)
 Surveyor I mission report. Part II – Scientific data and results – Sep 1966 (PDF)
 Details of Surveyor 1 launch, and also more on the Surveyor program
 Surveyor I images at Lunar and Planetary Institute
 Surveyor Site 1 Lunar Map at Lunar and Planetary Institute
 Surveyor Site 1 Lunar PhotoMap at Lunar and Planetary Institute
 Lunar Orbiter 1 photo 192, showing the northeastern part of Flamsteed P crater, where Surveyor 1 landed

1
Spacecraft launched in 1966
Missions to the Moon
Spacecraft launched by Atlas-Centaur rockets
Soft landings on the Moon
Derelict landers (spacecraft)
1966 on the Moon